The Pigeon River may refer to:

 Pigeon River (Minnesota–Ontario), between Minnesota, United States, and Ontario, Canada
 Pigeon River (Manitoba), a tributary of Lake Winnipeg
 One of four rivers named the Pigeon River (Michigan) in Michigan, United States
 Pigeon River (Tennessee – North Carolina), in the United States

See also 
 Pigeon Creek (disambiguation)
 Little Pigeon River (disambiguation)
 Pigeon (disambiguation)